Obermeyer is a family name in German speaking regions.

Its bearers include:

 Jacob Obermeyer, Bavarian Jewish Orientalist scholar and traveler (1845-1938)
 Klaus Obermeyer, manufacturer of ski wear and outdoor clothing (1919)

See also
 Obermaier
 9236 Obermair, asteroid discovered by Erich Meyer and named in Erwin Obermair honor
 Erwin Obermair, Austrian amateur astronomer and discoverer of asteroids (1946)
 Erich Obermayer, former Austrian football player (1953)
 Leopold Obermayer, Homosexual Jew of Swiss nationality, victim of Nazism (1892-1943)
 Franz Obermayr, Austrian Member of the European Parliament (1952)
 Siegfried Obermeier, German author of popular historical novels and history books (1936-2011)